Thomas Leezer (born 26 December 1985 in The Hague) is a Dutch former road bicycle racer, who competed between 2004 and 2020, for the ,  and  squads. In May 2019, he was named in the startlist for the 2019 Giro d'Italia.

Major results

2003
 1st  Road race, National Junior Road Championships
 1st Grand Prix Bati-Metallo
 9th Road race, UCI Junior Road World Championships
2004
 1st Stage 2 Cinturón a Mallorca
 6th Liège–Bastogne–Liège U23
2005
 2nd Overall Triptyque des Barrages Under-23
1st Stage 1
 10th Road race, National Under-23 Road Championships
2006
 2nd Road race, National Under-23 Road Championships
 4th Overall Olympia's Tour
 5th Paris–Tours Espoirs
 8th Overall Tour de la Somme
 8th Omloop der Kempen
 10th Omloop van het Houtland
2007
 1st  Road race, National Under-23 Road Championships
 1st  Overall Le Triptyque des Monts et Châteaux
1st Stage 2a (ITT)
 1st Stage 6 Vuelta a Navarra
 3rd Overall Tour de Normandie
 3rd Grand Prix de la Ville de Lillers
 4th Road race, UCI Road World Under-23 Championships
 5th Overall Olympia's Tour
1st Stage 2
 6th Beverbeek Classic
 6th Omloop der Kempen
2009
 3rd Overall Three Days of De Panne
 4th Tour de Rijke
 5th Kuurne–Brussels–Kuurne
 6th Dutch Food Valley Classic
 7th Trofeo Calvia
 8th Trofeo Cala
 8th Gent–Wevelgem
 Vuelta a España
Held  after Stages 2–3 
2010
 7th Vattenfall Cyclassics
 9th Dutch Food Valley Classic
2011
 8th Dwars door Vlaanderen
 9th Trofeo Magaluf-Palmanova
2013
 1st Stage 6 Tour de Langkawi
 3rd Overall Tour of Hainan
 10th Grote Prijs Jef Scherens
2019
 1st Stage 1 (TTT) UAE Tour

Grand Tour general classification results timeline

References

External links

 
 
 

1985 births
Living people
Dutch male cyclists
Cyclists from The Hague
UCI Road World Championships cyclists for the Netherlands
20th-century Dutch people
21st-century Dutch people